Islam is the most widely practised religion in Southeast Asia, numbering approximately 240 million adherents which translate to about 42% of the entire population, with majorities in Brunei, Indonesia and Malaysia as well parts of Southern Thailand and parts of Mindanao in the Philippines respectively. Significant minorities are located in the other Southeast Asian states. Most Muslims in Southeast Asia are Sunni and follow the Shafi`i school of fiqh, or religious law. It is the official religion in Malaysia and Brunei while it is one of the six official faiths in Indonesia.

Islam in Southeast Asia is heterogeneous and is manifested in many different ways. In some places in Southeast Asia, Islam is adapted to coexist with already existent local traditions. Mysticism is a defining characteristic of Islam in Southeast Asia, with a large following of Sufism. Mystic forms of Islam fit in well with already established traditions. The adaptation of Islam to local traditions is seen as a positive thing by Muslims in Southeast Asia. Islam is part of everyday life in Southeast Asia and is not separated from "non-religious realms". Southeast Asia contains the highest number of Muslims in the world, easily surpassing the Middle East and North Africa. Islam in Southeast Asia is neglected in Western study of Islam which centers around the Middle East.

Southeast Asian identity varies by regions that include Brunei, Cambodia, East Timor, Indonesia, Malaysia, Myanmar, the Philippines, Singapore, Thailand, and Vietnam. The heterogeneous nature of Southeast Asia combined with the widely varying practices and meanings of Islam suggests Islam in Southeast Asia has a multitude of variations in practice and belief.  Islam in Southeast Asia has been adapted into varying local norms across Southeast Asia. The Abangan are the dominant group of Muslims in Indonesia. The practices of the Abangan are heavily influenced by mysticism and embody a unique form of Islamic practice that incorporates rituals inherited from their pre Islamic ancestors.

History
Muslim merchants dominated trade in Southeast Asia by the 9th century or earlier.  There existed a colony of foreign Muslims on the west coast of Sumatra by 674 AD; other Muslim settlements began to appear after 878 AD when Islam increasingly took root among the people. However, little remains from these early communities, and the religion did not spread to significant parts of the population until the 12th century.

Muslim traders along the main trade-route between Western Asia and the Far East are thought to have been responsible for the introduction of Islam to Southeast and East Asia. The religion was then further spread by Sufi orders and finally consolidated by the expansion of the territories of converted rulers and their communities. The first Muslim communities arose in Aceh in Northern Sumatra. Malacca was an early stronghold of Islam as well, and it served as a starting point from which Islam was propagated along the trade routes in the region. There is no clear indication of when Islam first came to the region, but the first Muslim gravestone markings have been dated to 1082.

When Marco Polo visited the area in 1292 he noted that the urban port state of Perlak was Muslim, Chinese sources record the presence of a Muslim delegation to the emperor from the Kingdom of Samudra (Pasai) in 1282, other accounts provide instances of Muslim communities present in the Melayu Kingdom for the same time period while others record the presence of Muslim Chinese traders from provinces such as Fujian. The spread of Islam generally followed the trade routes east through the primarily Buddhist region and a half century later in the Malacca's we see the first dynasty arise in the form of the Sultanate of Malacca at the far end of the Archipelago form by the conversion of one Parameswara Dewa Shah into a Muslim and the adoption of the name Muhammad Iskandar Shah after his marriage to a daughter of the ruler of Pasai. In 1380, Sufi orders carried Islam from here on to Mindanao.

Another driving force for the change of the ruling class in the region was the concept among the increasing Muslim communities of the region when ruling dynasties to attempt to forge such ties of kinship by marriage. By the time the colonial powers and their missionaries arrived in the 17th century the region up to New Guinea was overwhelmingly Muslim with animist minorities.

The first written sources of Islam in Southeast Asia in 916 AD came from a merchant describing his experience in 1851 on the Island of Sumatra. Over time a series of Muslim port villages emerged on the scarcely populated coast. Islamic teachers from these port villages ventured to the interior of Sumatra. Over time these ports attracted Muslims from India, China, and the Arabian peninsula. These communities surpassed their utilitarian functions for trade and were integrated into the global network of Islam. Islam was popular in Southeast Asia because it, unlike previous belief systems could be used to validate a ruler's power through the divine. The spread of Islam throughout Southeast Asia and the Indonesian archipelago was a generally gradual and peaceful process that was heavily influenced by trade and interactions with merchants.

In the 12th century, the Indian Chola navy crossed the ocean and attacked the Srivijaya kingdom of Sangrama Vijayatunga Varman in Kadaram (Kedah). The capital of the powerful maritime kingdom was sacked and the king was taken captive. Along with Kadaram, Pannai in present-day Sumatra and Malaiyur and the Malayan peninsula were attacked. Soon after, the King of Kedah Phra Ong Mahawangsa became the first ruler to abandon the traditional Hindu faith and converted to Islam with the Sultanate of Kedah established in year 1136. Samudera Pasai converted to Islam in the year 1267. In the early 15th century, the first Sultan of Malacca, Parameswara, married the princess of Pasai, and their son converted to Islam. Soon Malacca became the centre of Islamic study and maritime trade; other rulers followed suit.

Islamic expansion in Southeast Asia 
By the end of the 15th century, several areas of northern Sumatra, including what is now Java, were governed by Muslim rulers. It wasn't until 1641 that the first Sultan took their title in what is now Java. Islam initially arrived on the coast of Sumatra, and spread down and around the coast to the Malacca strait and jumped across the strait to the Malay Peninsula.

In 1511, the Portuguese took over Malacca, but various other Muslim states began to grow in size and economic and political prominence. For example, Aceh dominated the region, both politically and economically, in the early seventeenth century. Through familial and trade relationships in these Muslim states, non-Islam states were slowly exposed to the faith. As it spread, Islam encountered pre-existing spiritual beliefs — including Buddhism and Hinduism — which continued to be practiced alongside Islam or were incorporated into Islam. Indeed, the faith introduced by some of the religious merchants was Sufism, a mystical version of Islam that is rejected by more conservative Muslims. Islamic law was also formally practiced in most areas that had encountered Islam, affecting cultural practices.

There are several theories to the Islamisation process in Southeast Asia. The first theory is trade. The expansion of trade among West Asia, India and Southeast Asia helped the spread of the religion as Muslim traders brought Islam to the region. Gujarati Muslims played a pivotal role in establishing Islam in Southeast Asia. The second theory is the role of missionaries or Sufis. The Sufi missionaries played a significant role in spreading the faith by syncretising Islamic ideas with existing local beliefs and religious notions. Finally, the ruling classes embraced Islam which further aided the permeation of the religion throughout the region. The ruler of the region's most important port, Malacca Sultanate, embraced Islam in the 15th century, heralding a period of accelerated conversion of Islam throughout the region as the religion provided a unifying force among the ruling and trading classes near mister man. The word daulat refers to the legitimacy of a ruler, through the power of God, and suggests the strong relationship between rule, legitimacy, and the spread of Islam.

The spread of Islam to Southeast Asia also depended largely on the translation and availability of religious texts. This was largely through Malay, a language that transected class. There are also a number of works in Javanese, particularly related to Javanese-Islamic mysticism. Some of the most significant Malay authors that helped in this translation are Hamzah Fansuri, Shams al-Din, and 'Abd al-Ra-uf.

Contemporary Islam in Southeast Asia
Muslims in Southeast Asia come from a variety of ethnic groups and backgrounds and speak a number of different languages, including Thai, Burmese, Malay, Marano, Tausug, Bahasa Indonesia, Javanese, and Chinese. Daily practices vary among countries and different regions within each country. Many of these differences relate to government policies and also on whether Muslims make up the majority or minority of the country's population.

Islam in Southeast Asia is multi-faceted and multi-layered. Different interpretations of the faith have resulted in a variety of groups. In Indonesia, there is the Nahdlatul Ulama, which preaches closely to the Shafi`i school of legal accretion, and the Muhammadiyah, whose outlook is a blend of modernist ideals with Islamic thoughts. Along with these two major groups, other Islamic groups also played an important role in Indonesian society, politics and economy, with their followers forming Islamic civil groups and political parties. 

Despite these differences, there are still common traditions practiced among many Muslims in Southeast Asia. For example, the five duties of Islam (Faith, Prayer, Charity, Fasting, Pilgrimage) form a foundation for many individuals' faith. Likewise, there are other shared traditions, such as prayer before meals.

In Southeast Asia, Islam influences other aspects daily of life, and there is a close relationship among religion, nation, and ethnicity. For example, there are an increasing number of private Islamic schools, which often combine Islamic religion, culture, and life. Likewise, medicine in Southeast Asia draws on a number of traditions, often combining animism, tibbun (which contains pre-Islamic elements), and hikmah (which is based upon a lineage of Muslim scholars and influenced modern biomedical practice). Islamic banks are also founded on Islamic principles and, for example, do not charge interest.

Islam has intersected with other religious practices in Southeast Asia in many different ways. For example, jinn, which indicates Islamic spiritual beings, has come to include Javanese spirits, as well. In countries such as Indonesia, in particular, animist traditions (as well as the traditions of other faiths, like Hindu and Buddhism) have become integral to the practice of Islam. Sufism has also shaped Islam in many Southeast Asian countries.

Islamic revivalism 
Since the late 1970s, an Islamic resurgence is taking place in the region. Dakwah movements mushroomed throughout Southeast Asia. These movements, in general, aim to create a strong Islamic identity among the Muslims and are understood as a response to changes in society and values. These movements have been referred to as "revivalism," "revitalisation," "resurgence," "renewal," and "Islamisation". As a result, Islam began to assume a larger role in public life, underlined by the increased donning of headscarves among Muslim women, for one example. Economic growth resulted in modest affluence which has translated into more religious investments like the Hajj and Islamic literature.

The Malaysian government promotes Islam through its Islamisation policies covering society, economics and education and, most recently, Islam Hadhari. Some of these movements have reflected a perceived tension between modernity and tradition, and they reflect movements taking place at the same time in other regions, like the Middle East. For example, Southeast Asian scholars who traveled to the Middle East during the early 1900s brought back ideas from the Modernist movement. In Indonesia, there are two large Muslim organisations. One, Muhammadiyah, is associated with this Modernist movement while the other, Nahdlatul Ulama, is a more traditional organisation meant to oppose the values of Modernism.

In today's modern age, Muslims interact with global technology, consumerism, and ideas in a variety of ways while practicing their faith. For some, this has resulted in an increase in religiosity and the observation of traditions such as Islamic devotional practices and fasting during Ramadan.

Pilgrimage 
Muslims in Southeast Asia have performed pilgrimages to Mecca since the 17th century as pilgrimage to the Holy Cities of Mecca and Medina is one of the Five Pillars of Islam. The Hajj was made easier by the advent of the steamship in the 19th century. As the Hajj became more popular throughout Southeast Asia, Arabic and the Arabian brand of Islam were integrated further into the lives of Muslims in Southeast Asia. Through travel to Arab countries — for the Hajj-pilgrimage or religious study — Muslims in Southeast Asia have also undertaken the translation of Islamic texts into local languages. Southeast Asia has rich and poor countries and this differences are reflected when wealthy people from Singapore and Brunei staying in comfortable hotels near the main mosque while Cambodians reported staying on the floor of a single room shared by 45 people in a dormitory two miles away.

Views on Arab culture 
Cornell professor Eric Tagliacozzo interviewed muslim Southeast Asians, he reported that most respondents said there was no racism and ethnocentricism in Mecca but some reported that Southeast Asian women reported feeling "physically smaller" and "pushed around" by people from all over the world including Tanzanians, Chechens, Afghans and Nigerians while circumambulating the Kaabah. Others felt that Arabs treated their women very badly in Mecca and believed Southeast Asians "did it better".

Persecution and terrorism 

The division of countries during colonialism divided some ethnic and religious groups, leading to several minority Muslim populations to live at the periphery of countries. Various organisations, like the Muslim World League, have advocated for the rights of these minority populations. There is a history in some countries of persecution of Muslims, including the ongoing ethnic cleansing of the Rohingya in Myanmar.

Finally, the war on terrorism, particularly since 9/11, has influenced contemporary Islam in Southeast Asia. Many governments in the region have joined antiterrorist coalitions or signed antiterrorist pacts. In some countries, such as the Philippines, the U.S. has sent troops to combat specific terrorist groups associated with Islamic extremism.

Prevalence
 Indonesia: 86.7%, one of six recognized religions
 Brunei: 80.9%, official religion
 Malaysia: 63.5%, official religion
 Singapore: 15.6%
 Philippines: 6%
 Thailand: 5.4% 
 Myanmar: 4.3%
 Cambodia: 1.9%
 Timor-Leste: 0.3%
 Vietnam: 0.1%
 Laos: 0.01%

See also

References

Further reading
 Heidhues, Mary, Somers. Southeast Asia: A Concise History. (London: Thames and Hudson. 2000)
 Mohd Taib Osman. "Islamisation of the Malays: A Transformation of Culture." In Bunga Rampai: Some Aspects of Malay Culture. KL: DBP, 1988 pp. 261–272.

External links
 
 History of Malay Peninsula

 
Southeast Asia
Maritime Southeast Asia
Islam by continent